Segala may refer to:

Ségala, a geographic region around Requista, in the departements of Aveyron and Tarn, southern France
Segala, Tanzania
Ségala, Mali, town and commune

See also
 Sigala (musician), English DJ and producer
 Sigala, Hiiu County, village in Hiiu Parish, Hiiu County, Estonia